The 2006–07 season was the 65th season of competitive association football in the Football League played by Chester City, an English club based in Chester, Cheshire.

Also, it was the third season spent in the Football League Two, after the promotion from the Football Conference in 2004. Alongside competing in the Football League the club also participated in the FA Cup, the Football League Cup and the Football League Trophy.

Football League

Results summary

Results by matchday

Matches

FA Cup

Football League Cup

Football League Trophy

Season statistics

References

2006–07